Madeleine is a 1919 German silent film directed by Siegfried Philippi and starring Ria Jende, Eduard von Winterstein and Hermann Vallentin.

The film's sets were designed by the art director Siegfried Wroblewsky.

Cast
 Ria Jende
 Eduard von Winterstein
 Hermann Vallentin
 Heinrich Schroth
 Hans Albers
 Emil Mamelok
 Rosa Valetti
 Magda Madeleine
 Anneliese Halbe
 Antonie Jaeckel
 Fritz Beckmann
 Henry Bender
 Adolphe Engers
 Olga Engl
 Rudolf Klein-Rhoden
 Emil Sondermann

References

Bibliography
 Hans-Michael Bock and Tim Bergfelder. The Concise Cinegraph: An Encyclopedia of German Cinema. Berghahn Books, 2009.

External links

1919 films
Films of the Weimar Republic
German silent feature films
Films directed by Siegfried Philippi
German black-and-white films
Films set in France
1910s German films